Carlos Berlocq successfully defended his last year's title. He defeated Filippo Volandri 6–3, 6–1 in the final.

Seeds

Draw

Finals

Top half

Bottom half

References
 Main Draw
 Qualifying Draw

Blu-express.com Tennis Cup - Singles
Internazionali di Tennis Città dell'Aquila